William Hilliard Price (born 1928) is a Canadian former curler. He played as lead on the 1957 and 1958 Brier-winning Team Alberta, skipped by Matt Baldwin. He was from Edmonton and also played basketball and baseball locally. He married Margaret Jeanne (Peggy) Blundell in 1950.

Price grew up in Saskatoon and attended the University of Alberta where he studied chemical engineering. There, he won the Gene Carrigan Trophy as the Edmonton's most outstanding junior athlete, as he was a top basketball player for the Alberta Golden Bears and was a top city baseball player at the time.

References

Living people
Brier champions
1928 births
Canadian male curlers
University of Alberta alumni
Curlers from Saskatoon
Curlers from Edmonton
Canadian men's basketball players